Coleman House was a former residence of George Drumgoole Coleman, an Irish architect and the Singapore's First Superintendent of Public Works. Construction started in 1823. The building was demolished in December 1965 to make way for the Peninsula Hotel in 1971.

History
Following Coleman's departure of Singapore due to an illness, the building was leased off to French hotelier Gaston Dutronquoy, who relocated the London Hotel to the house, and turned the dining room in to the Theatre Royal. The hotel was frequented by Joseph Conrad during his visits to Singapore. The building was turned into the Hotel de la Paix in 1856, and became the personal residence of Teochew businessman Tan Hiok Nee in the 1880s. The house was later converted into the Burlington Hotel, and served as a hotel or boarding house during World War II. The house was later leased off to shopkeepers who lived upstairs.

The Singapore goverenment offered to buy the house in 1955 for redevelopment. The building was demolished in 1965, with over a thousand squatters occupying the building prior to its demolition, and was replaced by the Peninsula Hotel and Shopping Centre.

References

Demolished buildings and structures in Singapore
Houses in Singapore
Places in Singapore
Hotels in Singapore
Houses completed in 1829
1829 establishments in the British Empire
1829 establishments in Singapore
1965 disestablishments in Singapore
Buildings and structures demolished in 1965
19th-century architecture in Singapore